Youth is the sixth studio album by Collective Soul, released in November 2004. The album was the band's first on their own label, EL Music Group, after leaving Atlantic Records following the release of their greatest hits album, Seven Year Itch.  The album contains a more balanced pop-rock sound than their previous albums Dosage and Blender.

Background 
After 2000's Blender both Ed and Dean Roland went through divorces. The band attempted to work through these circumstances and, according to Dean, at one point had enough material for two albums. However said material was darker and the band wanted the songs to have "a more positive, 'light at the end of the tunnel'-type vibe". The band eventually scrapped the material and completely started over.

Track listing
All tracks written by Ed Roland, except where noted.

Personnel
 Ed Roland – lead vocals, rhythm guitar, keyboards
 Dean Roland – rhythm guitar
 Will Turpin – bass guitar, backup vocals
 Joel Kosche – lead guitar, backing vocals
 Shane Evans – drums, percussion

Charts

Album

Singles

References

2004 albums
Albums produced by Ed Roland
Collective Soul albums
Self-released albums